Jerry Covington is a custom motorcycle builder and owner of Covingtons Customs.

Background 

Jerry started building custom motorcycles (choppers) in the early seventies and founded Covingtons Customs in Woodward, Oklahoma in 1993.
He has become well known in the motorcycle industry as one of the top custom builders for his clean designs and high quality custom motorcycles, and has appeared in numerous TV shows Including the Discovery Channel's Biker Build-Off series, Carlos Mencia's Mind of Mencia, and Corbin's Ride On.
Jerry has also been featured in several custom motorcycle related books including "Art of The Chopper", and "Top Chops".
Jerry's one of a kind motorcycles have won many awards, have been featured in dozens of magazines, including Easyriders, HotBike, and Street Chopper, and have been photographed by Michael Lichter Photography.
Jerry has built motorcycles for celebrities such as comedian Carlos Mencia, musician Sammy Hagar, and race car driver Billy Boat.

Press and publicity

Magazine Covers 
 American Bagger (U.S.) Apr. 2009
 HotBike (U.S.) Feb. 2009
 Easyriders (Germany) Mar. 2009
 Easyriders (U.S.) May. 2008
 American Cycle (U.S.) Jan. 2008
 Bikers Life (U.S.) Sep. 2008
 Easyriders (U.S.) Oct. 2007
 Biker Zone (Mexico) 2007 Vol 168
 Street Chopper (U.S.) Nov. 2006
 Hot Rod Bikes (U.S.) Jan. 2005
 Easyriders (U.S.) May. 2004
 V-Twin (U.S.) Mar. 2004
 Hot Rod Bikes (U.S.) Oct. 2003
 Street Chopper (U.S.) Apr. 2002

Magazine Articles 
 V-Twin (U.S.) Aug. 2009: To Russia, With Love: An International Success Story
 Distinctly Oklahoma (U.S.) Jul. 2009: "Get your Motor Runnin... Head Out on the Highway..."
 American Bagger (U.S.) Apr. 2009: "Covingtons: Retro Custom Bagger"
 HotBike (U.S.) Feb. 2009: Finned with Finess: Covingtons Classy Shovel
 American Bagger (U.S.) Feb. 2009: "Covingtons Customs: Billet Covers Part 2"
 Easyriders (Germany) Mar. 2009: Interview mit Jerry Covington
 V-Twin (U.S.) Apr. 2009: Jerry Covington: In For the Long Haul
 American Bagger (U.S.) May. 2008: The Fabricators Motorcycle: A Covingtons Showcase Bagger
 Easyriders (U.S.) May. 2008: Lucifer II: Giving the Devil His Due
 American Cycle (U.S.) Mar. 2008: Whiskey: Russell Orr's Covington Chopper
 American Cycle (U.S.) Jan. 2008: Covington vs Covington
 AMD (U.S.) Jan. 2008: Covingtons Cycle City: It's a Family Affair
 V-Twin Annual (U.S.) Jan. 2008: A Fist Full of Dollars: Covingtons Hi-Tech Pro-Street
 Hot Bike Baggers (U.S.) Jul. 2008: Sweet Glide: Covingtons Customs FLHX
 Bikers Life (Mexico) Sep. 2008: Psychodelic Chopper
 Easyriders (U.S.) Oct. 2007: One For The Books: Drag Specialties FatBook Sourced by Jerry Covington
 Barnetts (U.S.) Oct. 2007: Covingtons Customs Bobber: Featured Custom
 Easyriders (U.S.) Aug. 2007: A Fist Full of Dollars: Covingtons Hi-Tech Pro-Street
 V-Twin (U.S.) Jun. 2007: One Hundred Bucks Bought It: One lucky ticket holder got the deal of a lifetime
 American Bagger (U.S.) May. 2007: Covingtons Black Bagger Goes to South Africa: A Stunningly Subtle Two Wheeler
 Biker Zone (Mexico) 2007 Vol 168: Covingtons Black Bagger Goes to South Africa: A Stunningly Subtle Two Wheeler
 HotBike (U.S.) 2007 Vol.39 No.9: Covingtons El Capitan: Two Firsts For Covingtons Custom Cycles
 Easyriders (U.S.) Jan. 2006: Covingtons Pagan Gold Hot Rod: Lucifer 1
 Street Chopper (U.S.) Nov. 2006: Covingtons Hot Rod Twin Cam
 Hot Rod Bikes (U.S.) Jan. 2005: Scaring Soccer Moms Everywhere: Ultra Classic Redux
 Iron Works (U.S.) Aug. 2004: Shop Bike Special: Old School Bobber
 American Iron (U.S.) Jun. 2004: Covington Built Bagger: To Mark, It's the best of everything in one machine
 Hot Bike (U.S.) May. 2004: Old School Looks: At an Old School Price
 Easyriders (U.S.) May. 2004: Spirit Of The Chopper: Covingtons Keeper
 V-Twin (U.S.) Mar. 2004: When quality alone does all the selling: It's a Keeper
 Best of American Iron (U.S.) Softail Special 2004: Hold That E: An extreme machine for Xtreme Machine
 Best of American Iron (U.S.) Softail Special 2004: In Spades: Rodeo rider keeps it on two wheels
 Hot Bike (U.S.) Nov. 2003: Stretch Limo: Low Long and Aggressive
 Hot Rod Bikes (U.S.) Oct. 2003: Searchin: It all Began With an Axle Cover
 Street Chopper (U.S.) Jan. 2003: A Builders Bike: Or So He Thought
 V-Twin (U.S.) Dec. 2002: Master Builder Covington: Jerry's Lean, Clean, Running Machines
 Hot Rod Bikes (U.S.) Aug. 2002: Green, Clean, Riding Machine: A Pro Street Built for Two
 V-Twin (U.S.) July. 2002: A Herd of Choppers is Hittin' The Trails: Meanwhile, Back at The Ranch
 Street Chopper (U.S.) Apr. 2002: Arrogant Attitude: You'd Have One Too
 American Iron (U.S.) Apr. 2002: Hold That E: An extreme machine for Xtreme Machine
 Hot Bike (U.S.) Sep. 1998: Jerry's New Bike: All it cost was a shop ticket
 Easyriders (U.S.) Apr. 1997: Mutual Admiration Society

Books 
 Today's Top Custom Bike Builders 2009
 Art of The Bobber 2006
 Top Chops Oct. 2005
 Art of the Chopper Sep. 2005

Television appearances 
 Discovery Channel’s Biker Build-Off : Jerry Covington vs. Warren Vesely January 11, 2005
 Corbin's Ride On!
 Mind of Mencia : Season-1 Episode-9
 V-Twin TV
 Speedvision
 Discover Oklahoma
 Oklahoma Horizon

Awards and accomplishments 
 Induction into Sturgis Motorcycle Hall of Fame 2016
 Easyriders Invitational - Dallas 2008, Best of Show
 AMD World Championship 2006, 2nd place: Production Manufacturer
 Discovery Channel’s Biker Build-Off Champion for Jerry Covington vs. Warren Vesely January 11, 2005
 V-Twin Magazine, Best Custom Fabricated Bike
 All American Motorcycle Show 2004, Best of Show: Pro-Builders Class
 Easyriders Invitational - Houston 2004, 2nd place: Best of Show
 Easyriders Invitational - Louisville 2003, 1st place: Best Street Custom
 Easyriders Invitational - Louisville 2003, 2nd place: Best Radical
 Easyriders Invitational - Columbus 2003, 1st place: Best Radical
 Hot Bike Magazine, High Tech Product of 2000, for TC88B frame

References

External links 
 
Covington's Customs

People from Woodward, Oklahoma
Living people
Motorcycle builders
Year of birth missing (living people)